Dunga Bunga , is a town in Bahawalnagar District in the Punjab province, Pakistan. It lies on the Haroonabad-Bahawalnagar road.

The population of Dunga Bunga is around 100,000 according to the 2006 census. Dunga Bunga has more than 50 neighboring villages. The nearest towns are Soondha Soondha town is nearest the border and is a modern village, Gulab Ali, Bara Akuka Dinan Bishnoian Wala,  Rasulpura, Khraj Purah, Sundar Bishnoian, Hira Bishnoi, Bajak, Deputy Cart, Basti Islam Pura, khaima wala.

Etymology
The name Dunga Bunga is Hindustani. Dunga means downside and bunga means locality. The name is also associated with two Sikh brothers named Dunga Singh and Bunga Singh.

History
• Prior to partition of subcontinent Dunga Bunga was populated by Bishnoi Caste of Hindus and were known as Bahawalpuri Bishnois (i.e. Bishnois of Bahawalpur Riyasat)

• Bishnois from Dunga Bunga were Known for there unique language, rich Culture and Loyalty to the neighbors.

• The Proud and Wealthy community of Bishnois built many Temples in there Native Towns and Villages and were principally Large Landlords.

• Jains and Aroras were Traders and Bankers and entire business was in their Hands.

• Dunga Bunga is very close to the Indian border.

1947 Partition Violence and Massacres of Bishnois and Sikhs
•The Wealthy and Proud communities Bishnois and Sikhs were living peacefully with muslims neighbours.
But Widespread Genocide, Looting and Ethnic Cleansing in Dunga Bunga, forced them leave their Native Town and Native Villages for India which they never wished for.

• Gangsters and other local people gathered in groups on small Bridges on both Sadiqia Canals and Killed each and every Hindu and Sikh mercilessly, passing by them.

• Native population of Bahawalpuri Bishnois and Punjabi Sikhs was dropped to Zero.

2013 Unrest Incident
In 2003 unrest broke out in the town when hospital officials refused to conduct an autopsy on a Tonga driver. The family of the driver were believed to have been treated badly and this resulted in mob violence and police retaliation. By the time calm was restored, 19 police officials were reported injured, a labourer and shopkeeper were killed, and five others were seriously injured. These five were taken to a hospital in Bahawalpur, the district capital.

Municipal committee
Chairman: Rao Saleem Akhtar Vice chairman: Subah Sadiq Khokhar, 
Bashir Ahmed Zafar

Main Dunga Bunga
The main area of this union council includes Union Council Dunga Bunga. Nearby villages are Sundarwali, Dinan Bishnoian Wala, Denun Maharanawali, Khirajpura, Rasoolpura Soondha, Bajak, Basti Islam Pura and Gulab Ali.

Dunga Bishnoian
Dunga Bishnoian includes the Mohala Labana wala far behind Dunga Bunga Bypass. It starts at qureshi chowk and ends at the bypass of Dunga Bunga from the Gulab Ali side. Janaza-Gah and Mohalla Qasaiyan wala also includes in it. Disposal road and Gujjar House also in it. Road length 10 km
 Rest House Colony is known as Daman Pura is also attach with Dunga Bishnoian. It is opposite from Rest House Dunga Bunga.

Dunga Akuka
Dunga Akuka consists of the Akuka area. It starts at the main city bazaar of Dunga Bunga include Mohallah Masjid Mahajreen.

Educational institutions

 Government Higher Secondary School Dunga Bunga
 Allied School
 Fauji Foundation Model School, Dunga Bunga 

 Caramount Public School (PEEF)
 City public School (Peef)
 Islamic Public School
 Grace Public School Nai Abadi Dunga Bunga Principal Shahid Hussain 0302-4928499

Medical facilities
Medical facilities include a number of private medical clinics, with qualified doctors. Health facilities are primarily being provided by a rural health center situated within the city. A veterinary hospital is also present on the Highway Road. Resuce 1122 facility is also available at rural health center.

Social organization
Ujala Foundation is the only organization working in the area since 2006. Ujala Foundation is working for "Social Change Through Education".
Al Maqsood Education Academy is also doing valuable services for the poor students of the locality by providing free books and free coaching facility.

Media and news
Voice of Dunga Bunga is the news channel working in the area since 2018.

Main places
Chauhadry Photos and Mobiles Main Bazar Near National Bank Dunga Bnga0308-8747830

Banks
Muslim Commercial Bank Ltd. (MCB Bank), Habib Bank Ltd., National Bank of Pakistan Ltd., Zari Taraqiyati Bank Ltd.

Martyrs of Armed Forces
Rao Atif Sardar Shaheed DOS 26/11/2018, Rao Asif Mehfooz Shaheed DOS 04/02/2018, Rao Shahid Baboo Shaheed 07/08/2021.

References

External links 
 Map of Dunga Bunga
 Calm restored to Donga Bonga - Daily Times
 Dunga Bunga Political point of views
 Dunga Bunga Weather Updates
 Dunga Bunga Map
 Population
 Government Elections
 Calling Code Detail
 News and situations

Populated places in Bahawalnagar District